Roger Williams Public School No. 10, also known as South Scranton Catholic High School, is a historic school building located at Scranton, Lackawanna County, Pennsylvania.

Description
It was built about 1896, and is a two-story,  "I"-shaped brick and sandstone building in a Late Victorian style. It features a central three-story entrance tower with a hipped roof. A two-story brick addition was built in 1965.

The public school was closed in 1941, and subsequently acquired by the Roman Catholic Diocese of Scranton for use as a consolidated Catholic high school.  It was renamed in 1973, as Bishop Klonowski High School, and closed in 1982.

The property was acquired by Lackawanna Junior College in 1982.  In 2012, it is occupied by Goodwill Industries.

It was added to the National Register of Historic Places in 1997.

References

School buildings on the National Register of Historic Places in Pennsylvania
Victorian architecture in Pennsylvania
School buildings completed in 1896
Buildings and structures in Scranton, Pennsylvania
National Register of Historic Places in Lackawanna County, Pennsylvania